Rechipo is a 2009 Indian Telugu-language romantic action film, starring Nithiin and Ileana D'Cruz . The film is produced by G. V. Ramana, cinematography by T. Surendra Reddy and directed by Parachuri Murali. The film released on 25 September 2009. Later, it was dubbed into Tamil as Dhana and Hindi as Aaj Ka Naya Khiladi (2010). The film was an utter flop.

Cast
  Nithiin as Siva
 Ileana D'Cruz as Krishnaveni
 Bhanu Chander
 Sunil as Siva's friend
 MS Narayana as Naryana 
 Raghu Babu as Zimbabwe
 Ramaprabha as Aunt
 Ahuti Prasad as Home Minister (Krishnaveni's father) 
 Suman Shetty as Suman
 Shawar Ali as Kidnapper 
  Karuna Bhusan as Krishnaveni's friend
 Hema as Hema

Soundtrack

The songs were composed by Mani Sharma.

References

External links
 

2009 films
2000s Telugu-language films
Films scored by Mani Sharma
Indian romantic action films
Telugu films remade in other languages